Enrique Rivers Gutiérrez  (born 4 January 1961 in Limón) became one of the most famous Costa Rican football players during the 1980s.

Club career
Rivers made his debut in the Costa Rica Primera División in 1978 with hometown club Limonense.

He played most of his career with Saprissa, as well as for Comunicaciones in Guatemala and Herediano. He retired in 1993.

International career
Rivers made his debut for Costa Rica in a March 1983 friendly match against Mexico and he is mostly remembered for scoring the goal against Italy's national team during the 1984 Olympic Games held in Los Angeles. At that period of time, the Italians were the World Cup champions, and their defeat against Costa Rica was a historic event in the football world.

His final international was a May 1989 FIFA World Cup qualification match against Trinidad & Tobago.

Managerial career
After retiring from professional football, Rivers was assistant to manager Alexandre Guimarães for five years at Belén, Herediano and Saprissa, where they won the 1998 and 1999 local championships. His first job in charge was at Limonense in 2000 and he was head coach of Deportivo Saprissa for a short period of time as well, but decided to focus on the coordinating tasks for Saprissa's minor league system, where he has been able to discover and recruit young kids and launch them into successful football careers. In December 2012 he was put in charge of Saprissa's reserve team, Saprissa de Corazón, in the second division.

References

1961 births
Living people
People from Limón Province
Association football midfielders
Costa Rican footballers
Costa Rica international footballers
Olympic footballers of Costa Rica
Footballers at the 1984 Summer Olympics
Deportivo Saprissa players
Comunicaciones F.C. players
Costa Rican expatriate footballers
Expatriate footballers in Guatemala
Costa Rican expatriate sportspeople in Guatemala
Costa Rican football managers
Deportivo Saprissa managers
Deportivo Saprissa non-playing staff